Leptoglossus fulvicornis is a species of leaf-footed bug in the family Coreidae. It is found in North America.

The species is a specialist on magnolia fruit. Eggs are laid on the underside of leaves, and instars and adults feed on magnolia fruit and seeds.

References

External links

 

Articles created by Qbugbot
Insects described in 1842
Anisoscelidini